Eddie Dempsey (born c. 1982) is the assistant general secretary of the National Union of Rail, Maritime and Transport Workers (RMT), a trade union in the UK. He was elected in October 2021 to serve a five-year term until October 2026.

Dempsey supported general secretary Mick Lynch on media duties during the 2022 United Kingdom railway strikes, writing about the RMT's strike action in an article for the Morning Star, and speaking at a Manchester rally for the 'Enough is Enough' campaign, supporting calls for a national day of action in October 2022, and in Liverpool.

Dempsey was born and raised in South London's New Cross area to Irish parents, an upbringing that led him to become secretary of the Connolly Association, an Irish emigrant workers organisation. He has cited James Connolly and Padraig Pearse amongst his inspirations.

Dempsey identifies with socialism, and in 2019 spoke at events arguing the socialist case for the UK leaving the European Union, subsequently defending himself from criticism from journalist and left-wing activist Owen Jones, after Jones and fellow journalist Ash Sarkar withdrew from a London event because of Dempsey's support for a no-deal Brexit. Dempsey has participated in several marches against fascism and racism.

Personal life
Dempsey supports Millwall and Celtic football clubs.

References

British trade unionists

1982 births
Living people